Pawan Wickramasinghe (born 1 February 1994) is a Sri Lankan cricketer. He made his first-class debut for Nondescripts Cricket Club in the 2013–14 Premier Trophy on 31 January 2014.

References

External links
 

1994 births
Living people
Sri Lankan cricketers
Nondescripts Cricket Club cricketers
Cricketers from Colombo